Sylvan Beach may refer to

Sylvan Beach, New York, a village in Oneida County
A hamlet in the state of New York in the towns of Tyrone, New York in Schuyler County and Wayne, New York in Steuben County.
The community of Wabaningo, Michigan was formerly known as Sylvan Beach and there is still a beach there with that name.
A historic shoreline park in the La Porte, Texas.